Michael Friedman (October 25, 1960 – May 5, 2020) was an author, poet, editor, publisher, lawyer, and teacher. His most recent work, the fiction novel series Martian Dawn & Other Novels (2015) was recognized by Editor-in-Chief Lorin Stein of the Paris Review. The collection includes his first novel Martian Dawn, originally published in 2006 by Turtle Point Press, Are We Done Here? and On My Way To See You. Friedman is the author of poetry books Species (2000), and Distinctive Belt (1985), as well as poetry chapbooks Celluloid City (2003), Arts & Letters (1996), Cameo (1994), and Special Capacity (1992).  

Friedman was the cofounder and editor of the literary journal SHINY, which is now archived at New York University. His work has been published in the Great American Prose Poems: From Poe to the Present (2003) and the Encyclopedia of the New York School Poets (2009). He was the chair of the board of the Poetry Project at Saint Mark’s Church in New York City.    

Friedman obtained his B.A. in English from Columbia University and his M.A. in English Literature from Yale University. He earned a J.D. at Duke University School of Law. Friedman was also an adjunct professor in the MFA writing program at Naropa University. He was a partner at the law firm Haligman Lottner Rubin & Fishman, P.C, located in Denver Colorado, which is now part of the national law firm Fox Rothschild LLP.

Friedman was born in New Rochelle, New York, raised in New York City, and then moved to Denver where he married Dianne Perry. They have two sons Henry and Joe.

References

External links 

Columbia College (New York) alumni
Yale Graduate School of Arts and Sciences alumni
Duke University School of Law alumni
Naropa University faculty
21st-century American novelists
American male novelists
American male poets
Writers from New Rochelle, New York
1960 births
2020 deaths
21st-century American male writers